Kenneth Birkedal (born  19 November 1965) is a Danish former professional footballer who now works as an acupuncturist.

External links
Unofficial national team profile
 Boldklubben Frem profile
Nipserstat F.C. Copenhagen profile
Praktiserende Akupunktører profile

1965 births
Living people
Danish men's footballers
Boldklubben Frem players
F.C. Copenhagen players
Herfølge Boldklub players
Association football midfielders
Footballers from Copenhagen